Srinakharinwirot University (abbr: SWU; ; abbr: มศว) is a public university in Bangkok, Thailand. Founded in 1949, the university was the first upper-education institution to concentrate solely on teacher training. The name "Srinakharinwirot" was given by King Bhumibol Adulyadej to honour his Mother Princess Srinagarindra (transliterated as ). Srinakharinwirot University has two campuses; Prasarnmit Campus in Bangkok's Watthana district and Ongkharak Campus in Nakhon Nayok province's Ongkharak district. Other minor campuses include Bhodivijjalaya College’s campuses in Sa Kaeo province and Chiang Mai province’s Mae Chaem district.

The university originally had 8 regional campuses; Prasanmitr, Pathumwan, Bang Saen, Phitsanulok, Maha Sarakham, Songkhla, Bang Khen and Phala Suksa (lit. Physical Education). The Prasanmitr campus remains the headquarter of the university, whilst Pathumwan Campus now exists as its teaching school, Patumwan Demonstration School. Some were later established as new universities; Burapha University (formerly Bang Saen Campus), Naresuan University (formerly Phitsanulok Campus), Mahasarakham University (formerly Mahasarakham Campus) and Thaksin University (formerly Songkhla Campus). The Bang Khen Campus was closed, moving to the main Prasarnmitr Campus, its former land is now occupied by the Phranakhon Rajabhat University. Lastly, the Phala Suksa Campus was closed and moved to Ongkharak Campus, being renowned as Faculty of Physical Education.

The university's motto "Education is Growth" resembles the initial aim of teacher training and is illustrated through the logo resembling the exponential graph, meaning the exponential growth.

History
The university had its beginnings when the Higher Teacher Training School at Prasarnmit was founded in 1949. Prasarnmit was the first of its kind in the country's history. In 1953, it became the College of Education, having authority to grant a bachelor's degree in Education in the subject majors taught in Thai primary and secondary schools. Subsequently, programs at both the bachelors and masters levels were developed. In 1964, branch campuses were established for the regions of the country. The following were eventually created:

Phitsanulok campus, for the north, now Naresuan University
Maha Sarakham campus, for the northeast, now Mahasarakham University
Bangsaen campus, for the southeast, now Burapha University  
Songkhla campus, for the south, now Thaksin University

Additional central campuses were also established:
Pathumwan campus, now merged with Prasarnmit campus
Physical Education campus, now merged with Faculty of Physical Education, Ongkharak campus
Bang Khen campus, now merged with Prasarnmit campus

In 1974, the College of Education became a comprehensive university by a royal decree of King Bhumibol Adulyadej, who granted the university the name of Srinakharinwirot (See-na-ka-reen-wee-rot), which means 'the glory of the city'.

The university offered undergraduate degrees in education, humanities, social science, science, physical education, and graduate degrees in education.  In the higher education development plan Phase Five (1982-1986), a faculty of medicine was added; in Phase Seven (1992-1996), engineering, fine arts, and dentistry; and in Phase Eight (1997-2001), pharmacy, health science, and nursing. SWU Prasanmit has developed to be a metropolitan university focusing on graduate studies. SWU Ongkaruk has focused on the development of health science, technology, environment and community services.

Over the years, the regional campuses grew in size and became separate universities. However, they preserve an unofficial tie with Srinakarinwirot University and regard the Bangkok university as their "mother campus".

Affiliations

Faculties

 Faculty of Education
 Faculty of Economics
 Faculty of Humanities
 Literature
 Language
 History
 Philosophy
 Psychology
 Information studies
 Language for careers ( International)
 Language for communication ( International)
 Faculty of Fine Arts
Visual Arts
Products Design
Fashion Design
Jewelry Design
Communication Design
Acting and Directing
Theater Design
Thai Dance 
Western Dance
Music
Arts and Cultural Management Innovation 
Art Education 
Music Education 
Thai Dance Education 
 Faculty of Social Sciences
 Faculty of Physical Education 
Sports and Exercise Science
Public Health
Recreation Leadership
Physical Education
Health Education
Health Education and Physical Education
 Faculty of Science
Faculty of Medicine
HRH Princess Sirindhorn Medical Centre, Nakhon Nayok
Panyananthaphikkhu Medical Centre Chonlaprathan, Nonthaburi
 Faculty of Nursing
 Faculty of Pharmacy
 Faculty of Dentistry
 Faculty of Physical Therapy
 Faculty of Engineering
 Faculty of Agricultural Product Innovation and Technology
 Faculty of Environmental Culture and Ecotourism
 Faculty of Business Administration for Society

Colleges
 International College for Sustainability Studies
 College of Social Communication Innovation 
 Bodhivijjalaya College
 College of Creative Industry

Schools
 The Graduate School
 School of Economics and Public Policy

Institutes/centers
 Behavioral Science Research Institute
 Institute of Culture and Arts
 Educational Research Development and Demonstration Institute
 Strategic Wisdom and Research Institute
 Research and Development Institute for Special Education
 Educational and Psychological Test Bureau
 Computer Center
 Center for Educational Media and Technology
 Central Library
 Innovation Learning Center
 Science Education Center

Demonstration schools 
 Prasarnmit Demonstration School, Srinakharinwirot University (Elementary)  
 Prasarnmit International Programme, Srinakharinwirot University (Elementary )
 Prasarnmit Demonstration School, Srinakharinwirot University (Secondary)
 Patumwan Demonstration School, Srinakharinwirot University
 Prasarnmit International Programme, Srinakharinwirot University (Secondary)
 Ongkharak Demonstration School, Srinakharinwirot University
 Princess Srinagarindra Demonstration School Maecheam, Chiangmai, Bodhivijjalaya Collage, Srinakharinwirot University

References

External links
Official website

 
Educational institutions established in 1949
Universities and colleges in Bangkok
1949 establishments in Thailand
Universities established in the 1970s